This is a list of statistical records for the Argentina national football team.

Individual records

Players in bold are still active with Argentina.

Most capped players

Top goalscorers

World Cup winning captains

Goals
 Most goals scored: 98, Lionel Messi, 2005–
 Oldest goalscorer: Martín Palermo, 36 years and 7 months old in 2010 against Greece
 Youngest goalscorer: Diego Maradona, 18 years, 284 days old in 1979 against Scotland
 Youngest player to score in a FIFA World Cup match: Lionel Messi 18 years and 357 days, against Serbia and Montenegro in 2006
 Most goals scored in a single match: 5 – Manuel Seoane in 1925, Juan Marvezzi in 1941, Lionel Messi in 2022
 Most goals scored in a calendar year:  18 – Lionel Messi (2022)

Manager records
 Most appearances
 Guillermo Stábile: 127 Guillermo coached Argentina in 123 matches which made him among the few coaches who were in charge of more than 100 international matches. While still with the national team, he led them to victories in the South American Championship in 1941, 1945, 1946, 1947, 1955, and 1957.

Competition records

FIFA World Cup

*Draws include knockout matches decided via penalty shoot-out.

Copa América

FIFA Confederations Cup

Olympic Games

Pan American Games

Head-to-head record
This is a list of the official games played by the Argentina national team. The team has played a number of countries around the world, some repeatedly, although it has played the most games (201) against neighboring Uruguay.

Updated to 18 December 2022 after the match against .

See also
Argentina–Brazil football rivalry
Argentina–Uruguay football rivalry
Argentina–England football rivalry

Notes

References

Argentina national football team records and statistics
National association football team records and statistics